Anjerd (also Romanized as Enjerd; also known as Anjar, Anjīr, and Engert) is a village in Owch Hacha Rural District, in the Central District of Ahar County, East Azerbaijan Province, Iran. At the 2006 census, its population was 568, in 104 families.

References 

Populated places in Ahar County